The 2022–23 BBL season is the 36th season of the British Basketball League, the top British professional basketball league, since its establishment in 1987. The season features 10 teams from across England and Scotland.

Teams

Arenas and locations 

 On 13 September 2022, Glasgow Rocks were rebranded as Caledonia Gladiators.

Personnel and sponsorship

Coaching changes

BBL Championship 
The BBL Championship reverted to a four-game series format, for the first time since the 2006–07 season, for a 36-game regular season played across 29 Rounds between September 2022 to April 2023.

Standings

Results

Ladder progression

BBL Cup

First round

Quarterfinals

Semifinals

Cup Final

BBL Trophy 
The BBL Trophy retained the same 16-team bracket format as introduced for the 2018–19 season. The ten BBL teams were drawn in the first round by six invited teams; St Mirren from the Scottish Basketball Championship, Basketball Wales, and Worthing Thunder, Derby Trailblazers, Nottingham Hoods and Thames Valley Cavaliers from the National Basketball League.

First round

Quarterfinals

Semifinals

Trophy Final

Playoffs

Bracket

British clubs in European competitions

References

External links 

British Basketball League seasons
2022–23 in British basketball
Britain
British